Desperado is the fourth album by High Rise, released on July 10, 1998 through P.S.F. Records.

Track listing

Personnel 
High Rise
Shoji Hano – drums
Asahito Nanjo – vocals, bass guitar, recording
Munehiro Narita – guitar
Production and additional personnel
High Rise – production

References 

1998 albums
High Rise (band) albums
P.S.F. Records albums